The 2015–16 Deutsche Eishockey Liga season was the 22nd season since the founding of the Deutsche Eishockey Liga.

Teams

Regular season

Results

Matches 1–26

Matches 27–52

Playoffs

Bracket

Playoff qualification
The playoff qualification were played between 9 and 13 March 2016 in a best-of-three mode.

Kölner Haie vs. Adler Mannheim

ERC Ingolstadt vs. Straubing Tigers

Quarterfinals
The quarterfinals were played between 15 and 28 March 2016 in a best-of-seven mode.

EHC München vs. Straubing Tigers

Eisbären Berlin vs. Kölner Haie

Iserlohn Roosters vs. Thomas Sabo Ice Tigers

EHC Wolfsburg vs. Düsseldorfer EG

Semifinals
The semifinals were played between 30 March and 13 April 2016 in a best-of-seven mode.

EHC München vs. Kölner Haie

EHC Wolfsburg vs. Thomas Sabo Ice Tigers

Final
The finals were played between 15 and 28 April 2016 in a best-of-seven mode.

References

External links
Official website

2015-16
2015–16 in European ice hockey leagues
2015–16 in German ice hockey